Venus (Italian: Venere) is a 1932 Italian film directed by Nicola Fausto Neroni and starring Ellen Meis, Maurizio D'Ancora and Evelina Paoli.

Cast
 Ellen Meis as La diva del varietà  
 Maurizio D'Ancora as Il giovane Italo-Americano  
 Evelina Paoli as Sua madre  
 Giorgio Bianchi as L'amante della diva  
 Rossana D'Alba  
 Olga Capri 
 Oreste Fares 
 Tina Ceccaci Renaldi
 Alfredo Del Pelo as Il chitarrista

References

External links 
 

1932 films
1930s Italian-language films
Italian black-and-white films
1930s Italian films